Hamyard is a village in Howmeh Rural District, in the Central District of Semnan County, Semnan Province, Iran. At the 2006 census, its population was 13, in 8 families.

References 

Populated places in Semnan County